Desmarest's spiny pocket mouse (Heteromys desmarestianus) is a species of rodent in the family Heteromyidae. It is found in Colombia, Costa Rica, El Salvador, Guatemala, Honduras, Mexico, Nicaragua, and Panama.

References

Heteromys
Mammals of Colombia
Rodents of Central America
Mammals described in 1868
Taxonomy articles created by Polbot